The Baychester Avenue station is a station on the IRT Dyre Avenue Line of the New York City Subway, located at the intersection of Baychester and Tillotson Avenues in the Bronx. It is served by the 5 train at all times.

History 
Baychester Avenue opened on May 29, 1912 as a local station of the New York, Westchester and Boston Railway (NYW&B). This station was closed on December 12, 1937 when the NYW&B went bankrupt.

The New York City Board of Transportation (BOT) bought the NYW&B within the Bronx north of East 180th Street in April 1940 for $1.8 million and rehabilitated the line. On May 15, 1941, a shuttle service was implemented between Dyre Avenue and East 180th Street using IRT gate cars. The Dyre Avenue Line was connected directly to the White Plains Road Line north of East 180th Street for $3 million and through service began on May 6, 1957.

On February 27, 1962, the New York City Transit Authority announced a $700,000 modernization plan of the Dyre Avenue Line. At the time, the line was served by 9-car trains during the day, and 3-car shuttles overnight. Between 1954 and 1961, ridership on the line increased by 100%, owing to the development of the northeast Bronx.

On April 18, 1965, IRT Broadway–Seventh Avenue Line trains and IRT Lexington Avenue Line trains swapped their northern routings, with Broadway–Seventh Avenue 2 trains running via the IRT White Plains Road Line to 241st Street, and Lexington Avenue 5 trains running via the Dyre Avenue Line to Dyre Avenue. The line is still operated as a shuttle late nights.

The northbound platform was closed between September 9, 1991 and June 15, 1992 so that it could be rehabilitated. The platform was supposed to reopen in May. As part of the project, the station received an improved electrical system, new lighting, reinforced concrete platforms, a new canopy, a new drainage system, new graphics on windscreens and new handrails.

Station layout 

The station has two side platforms and three tracks with space for a fourth. It is on an embankment with a cut in the embankment for the street to run below (Baychester Avenue).

Exit
The station house is on street level below the platforms and tracks on their extreme north end. A staircase from each platform goes down to an underpass, where on the Dyre Avenue-bound side, a single exit-only turnstile leads to a set of doors to the streets. The main fare control area is on the Manhattan-bound side. It has a set of doors to the underpass, another to the platform stairs, a turnstile bank, token booth, and doors to the streets.

References

External links 

 
 Station Reporter — 5 Train
 The Subway Nut — Baychester Avenue Pictures 
 New York, Westchester and Boston Railway - Baychester Avenue Station
 Baychester Avenue entrance from Google Maps Street View
Platforms from Google Maps Street View

IRT Dyre Avenue Line stations
New York City Subway stations in the Bronx
Railway stations in the United States opened in 1912
Railway stations in the United States opened in 1941
1912 establishments in New York City
Eastchester, Bronx